The East Raleigh–South Park Historic District is the largest African-American neighborhood in Raleigh, North Carolina. The district, located south and east of downtown Raleigh, covers approximately 30 blocks and contains portions of the Smith–Haywood and St. Petersburg neighborhoods. Most homes in these neighborhoods were built between 1900 and 1940, with one-fifth dating back to the 19th century. Historic buildings in the district include Estey Hall and Leonard Hall, both located on the campus of Shaw University. The district was listed on the National Register of Historic Places in October 1990.

See also
 List of Registered Historic Places in North Carolina

References

External links

 National Register Historic Districts in Raleigh, North Carolina, RHDC
 East Raleigh-South Park Historic District, RHDC

Historic districts on the National Register of Historic Places in North Carolina
National Register of Historic Places in Raleigh, North Carolina
Italianate architecture in North Carolina
Colonial Revival architecture in North Carolina
African-American history in Raleigh, North Carolina
Neighborhoods in Raleigh, North Carolina